Poch is a card game.

Poch or POCH may also refer to:

 Progressive Organizations of Switzerland, a defunct communist party
 Poch (surname), with a list of people surnamed Poch
 Poch Juinio, basketball player
 Mauricio Pochettino, association football player and manager